TV Libertés, or TVL (English: "TV Liberties"), is a French far-right Web TV launched in January 2014. The group is led by Philippe Milliau and Martial Bild, a former Front National leader. TV Libertés is recognized by observers for its professionalism when compared to other French far-right channels, and it seeks to compete with mainstream cable TV. Alain de Benoist and Gilbert Collard, among others, have hosted talk shows on the channel.

History

Background 

The project was initiated as "Notre antenne" by Philippe Millau (former GRECE and Bloc Identitaire) and Gilles Arnaud (former Front National). In 2013, the founders called for donations, hoping to raise around 1.5 million euros. Numerous far-right figures responded by sponsoring the project, among them Jean-Yves Le Gallou, Yvan Blot, Robert Ménard, Paul-Marie Coûteaux, Renaud Camus, Yvan Blot, Bruno Mégret, Pierre Descaves, Michel Marmin, Roger Holeindre, Jean-Michel Dubernard, Bernard Lugan, and Jean Raspail. TV Libertés was officially launched on YouTube in January 2014.

Development 
TV Libertés has promoted pro-Russian views regarding international relations. In September 2014 it was the only French TV channel allowed to cover a meeting of Sergey Naryshkin held at the Russian embassy in Paris. During the informal parliamentary election held in the Donetsk People's Republic and the Luhansk People's Republic, TV Libertés was allowed to cover the work of the French "election monitor", Jean-Luc Shaffhauser.

Since 2017, it broadcasts a video talk show, Le Plus d'Élements, hosted by Olivier François in collaboration with the Nouvelle Droite magazine Éléments.

In June 2018, the YouTube channel was shutdown due to "infringement to copyright", which led to critical reactions from Front National members, including its leader Marine Le Pen. The organization started to publish videos again on YouTube in February 2019.

Organization 
TV Libertés is directed by Philippe Milliau, the president of the channel, and Martial Bild, who serves as its editor-in-chief. The group also owns a radio station named "Radio Libertés".

Guests 
The aim of the channel is to bridge far-right and mainstream right-wing figures. Several FN politicians have been interviewed, including Thierry Mariani, Marion Maréchal, Nicolas Bay, Louis Aliot, and Bruno Gollnisch.

References

Streaming television
2014 establishments in France
Far-right politics in France